Tarantula is an American adult animated sitcom. It is adapted from a web series of the same name, which was released on YouTube by its creator, Carson Mell, from 2012 to 2015. It aired on TBS from December 4 until December 25, 2017.

On March 19, 2018, TBS canceled the series after one season. Mell has since revived and continued the original web series that the TV series was based on.

Premise
A respected but uncertified tattoo artist delivers absurd yet introspective monologues about the residents of the Tierra Chula Resident Hotel and their misadventures.

Cast
 Carson Mell as Echo Johnson, Booty
 Dan Bakkedahl as Lucas
 Jacob Vargas as Paja
 Lauren Weedman as Bess
 Steve Jones as Dominic

Development
Creator Carson Mell has stated that the inspiration for the show and the original webseries came from his exasperation with "anti-hero" humor. Departing from the misanthropic humor of contemporary adult animation shows such as Rick and Morty, Mell instead sought "to make a show where people are nice to each other, where if you hurt someone’s feelings it’s a big deal."

Episodes
The entire season was released on the TBS app/website on December 3, 2017.

Broadcast
Prior to the television release date, the entire series was released on the TBS website and app on December 3, 2017. The series made its television debut on December 4, 2017 at 10pm on TBS.

Ratings
The series premiere involved the back to back broadcast of episodes of episodes 3 and 4 as the first two episodes were not aired on broadcast television. Episode 3 attracted 380,000 viewers and episode four had 230,000 viewers.

Notes

References

2010s American adult animated television series
2010s American animated comedy television series
2010s American sitcoms
2017 American television series debuts
2017 American television series endings
American adult animated comedy television series
American animated sitcoms
English-language television shows
TBS (American TV channel) original programming
Fictional hotels
Television series by Rough Draft Studios
Television series by Studio T
Television series set in hotels